The mayor of Turin (Italian: sindaco di Torino) is an elected politician who, along with the Turin City Council of 40 members, is accountable for the government of Turin, Piedmont, Italy.

The current mayor is Stefano Lo Russo, a university professor of Geology and member of the Democratic Party, who took office on 27 October 2021.

List

Kingdom of Sardinia (1814-1848)
From 1814 to 1848 the City of Turin was administrated by a Decurionato (City Council) led by two annual syndics (sindici).

Kingdom of Sardinia (1848-1861)
The office of Mayor of Turin (Sindaco di Torino) was created by the Kingdom of Sardinia in 1848 after the promulgation of the Albertine Statute.

Kingdom of Italy (1861-1946)
After the creation of the Kingdom of Italy, the Mayor of Turin was elected as continuation of the previous office created during the Kingdom of Piedmont-Sardinia. The Fascist dictatorship abolished mayors and City councils in 1926, replacing them with an authoritarian Podestà chosen by the National Fascist Party. The office of Mayor was restored in 1945 during the Allied occupation.

Italian Republic (since 1946)

City Council election (1946-1993)
From 1946 to 1993, the Mayor of Turin was elected by the City Council.

Notes

Direct election (since 1993) 
Since 1993, under provisions of new local administration law, the Mayor of Turin is chosen by direct election, originally every four then every five years.

Notes

Timeline

Elections

Mayoral and City Council election, 1993
The election took place in two rounds: the first on 6 June, the second on 20 June 1993.

|- 
| colspan="7"| 
|-
|- style="background-color:#E9E9E9;text-align:center;"
! colspan="4" rowspan="1" style="text-align:left;" | Parties and coalitions
! colspan="1" | Votes
! colspan="1" | %
! colspan="1" | Seats
|-
| style="background-color:#FA6E79" rowspan="4" |
| style="background-color:" |
| style="text-align:left;" | Communist Refoundation Party (Rifondazione Comunista)
| PRC
| 63,842 || 14.65% || 5
|-
| style="background-color:" |
| style="text-align:left;" | The Network (La Rete)
| LR 
| 30,890 || 7.09% || 2
|-
| style="background-color:" |
| style="text-align:left;" | Green Alliance (Alleanza Verde)
| AV
| 15,034 || 3.45% || 1
|-
| style="background-color:" |
| style="text-align:left;" | Pensioners' Party (Partito Pensionati)
| PP
| 5,890 || 1.35% || 0
|- style="background-color:#FA6E79"
| style="text-align:left;" colspan="4" | Novelli coalition (Left-wing)
| 115,656 || 26.54% || 8
|-
| style="background-color:" |
| style="text-align:left;" colspan="2" | Lega Nord
| LN
| 102,045 || 23.41% || 7
|-
| style="background-color:pink" rowspan="3" |
| style="background-color:" |
| style="text-align:left;" | Democratic Party of the Left (Partito Democratico della Sinistra)
| PDS
| 41,553 || 9.53% || 14
|-
| style="background-color:" |
| style="text-align:left;" | Democratic Alliance (Alleanza Democratica)
| AD
| 31,366 || 7.20% || 10
|-
| style="background-color:" |
| style="text-align:left;" | Federation of the Greens (Federazione dei Verdi)
| FdV
| 18,034 || 4.14% || 6
|- style="background-color:pink"
| style="text-align:left;" colspan="4" | Castellani coalition (Centre-left)
| 90,953 || 20.87% ||30
|-
| style="background-color:lightblue" rowspan="2" |
| style="background-color:" |
| style="text-align:left;" | Christian Democracy (Democrazia Cristiana)
| DC
| 54,230 || 12.44% || 4
|-
| style="background-color:" |
| style="text-align:left;" | Italian Liberal Party (Partito Liberale Italiano)
| PLI
| 11,697 || 2.68% || 0
|- style="background-color:lightblue"
| colspan="4" style="text-align:left;" | Zanetti coalition (Centre)
| 65,927 || 15.13% || 4
|-
| style="background-color:" |
| style="text-align:left;" colspan="2" | Italian Social Movement (Movimento Sociale Italiano)
| MSI
| 25,555 || 5.86% || 1
|-
| style="background-color:" |
| style="text-align:left;" colspan="2" | Others 
| 
| 35,679 || 8.19% || 0
|-
| colspan="7" style="background-color:#E9E9E9" | 
|- style="font-weight:bold;"
| style="text-align:left;" colspan="4" | Total
| 435,815 || 100% || 50
|-
| colspan="7" style="background-color:#E9E9E9" | 
|-
| style="text-align:left;" colspan="4" | Votes cast / turnout 
| 639,386 || 77.08% || style="background-color:#E9E9E9;" |
|-
| style="text-align:left;" colspan="4" | Registered voters
| 829,491 ||  || style="background-color:#E9E9E9;" |
|-
| colspan="7" style="background-color:#E9E9E9" | 
|-
| style="text-align:left;" colspan="7" | Source: Ministry of the Interior
|}

Notes

Mayoral and City Council election, 1997
The election took place in two rounds: the first on 27 April, the second on 11 May 1997.

|- 
| colspan="7"| 
|-
|- style="background-color:#E9E9E9;text-align:center;"
! colspan="4" rowspan="1" style="text-align:left;" | Parties and coalitions
! colspan="1" | Votes
! colspan="1" | %
! colspan="1" | Seats
|-
| style="background-color:pink" rowspan="6" |
| style="background-color:" |
| style="text-align:left;" | Democratic Party of the Left (Partito Democratico della Sinistra)
| PDS
| 85,857 ||18.97% || 14
|-
| style="background-color:" |
| style="text-align:left;" | Communist Refoundation Party (Rifondazione Comunista)
| PRC
| 53,536 || 11.83% || 8
|-
| style="background-color:" |
| style="text-align:left;" | Democratic Alliance (Alleanza Democratica)
| AD
| 30,580 || 6.76% || 5
|-
| style="background-color:pink" |
| style="text-align:left;" | Italian People's Party (Partito Popolare Italiano)
| PPI
| 17,470 || 3.86% || 2
|-
| style="background-color:" |
| style="text-align:left;" | Federation of the Greens (Federazione dei Verdi)
| FdV
| 12,101 || 2.67% || 1
|-
| style="background-color:" |
| style="text-align:left;" | Pensioners' Party (Partito Pensionati)
| PP
| 4,514 || 1.00% || 0
|- style="background-color:pink"
| style="text-align:left;" colspan="4" | Castellani coalition (Centre-left)
| 204,508 || 45.09% || 30
|-
| style="background-color:lightblue" rowspan="4" |
| style="background-color:" |
| style="text-align:left;" | Forza Italia 
| FI
| 123,622 || 27.32% || 12
|-
| style="background-color:" |
| style="text-align:left;" | National Alliance (Alleanza Nazionale)
| AN
| 42,874 || 9.47% || 4
|-
| style="background-color:" |
| style="text-align:left;" | Christian Democratic Centre (Centro Cristiano Democratico)
| CCD
| 21,291|| 4.70% || 2
|-
| style="background-color:" |
| style="text-align:left;" | Others 
| 
| 6,890 || 1.52% || 0
|- style="background-color:lightblue"
| colspan="4" style="text-align:left;" | Costa coalition (Centre-right)
| 194,977 || 43.02% || 18
|-
| style="background-color:" |
| style="text-align:left;" colspan="2" | Lega Nord
| LN
| 30,516 || 6.74% || 2
|-
| style="background-color:" |
| style="text-align:left;" colspan="2" | Others 
| 
| 23,273 || 4.34% || 0
|-
| colspan="7" style="background-color:#E9E9E9" | 
|- style="font-weight:bold;"
| style="text-align:left;" colspan="4" | Total
| 452,524 || 100% || 50
|-
| colspan="7" style="background-color:#E9E9E9" | 
|-
| style="text-align:left;" colspan="4" | Votes cast / turnout 
| 587,636 || 73.68% || style="background-color:#E9E9E9;" |
|-
| style="text-align:left;" colspan="4" | Registered voters
| 797,552 ||  || style="background-color:#E9E9E9;" |
|-
| colspan="7" style="background-color:#E9E9E9" | 
|-
| style="text-align:left;" colspan="7" | Source: Ministry of the Interior
|}

Notes

Mayoral and City Council election, 2001
The election took place in two rounds: the first on 13 May, the second on 27 May 2001.

|- 
| colspan="7"| 
|-
|- style="background-color:#E9E9E9;text-align:center;"
! colspan="4" rowspan="1" style="text-align:left;" | Parties and coalitions
! colspan="1" | Votes
! colspan="1" | %
! colspan="1" | Seats
|-
| style="background-color:lightblue" rowspan="5" |
| style="background-color:" |
| style="text-align:left;" | Forza Italia 
| FI
| 154,773 || 32.27% || 15
|-
| style="background-color:" |
| style="text-align:left;" | National Alliance (Alleanza Nazionale)
| AN
| 37,413 || 7.80% || 3
|-
| style="background-color:" |
| style="text-align:left;" | Lega Nord 
| LN
| 11,259 || 2.35% || 1
|-
| style="background-color:" |
| style="text-align:left;" | Christian Democratic Centre (Centro Cristiano Democratico)
| CCD
| 8,968 || 1.87% || 0
|-
| style="background-color:" |
| style="text-align:left;" | Others 
| 
| 15,523 || 3.24% || 0
|- style="background-color:lightblue"
| colspan="4" style="text-align:left;" | Rosso coalition (Centre-right)
| 227,954 || 47.53% || 19
|-
| style="background-color:pink" rowspan="6" |
| style="background-color:" |
| style="text-align:left;" | The Daisy (La Margherita)
| DL
| 88,832 || 18.43% || 14
|-
| style="background-color:" |
| style="text-align:left;" | Democrats of the Left (Democratici di Sinistra)
| DS
| 80,759 || 16.84% || 13
|-
| style="background-color:" |
| style="text-align:left;" | Party of Italian Communists (Comunisti Italiani)
| PdCI
| 12,274 || 2.56% || 2
|-
| style="background-color:" |
| style="text-align:left;" | Federation of the Greens (Federazione dei Verdi)
| FdV
| 6,356 || 1.33% || 1
|-
| style="background-color:" |
| style="text-align:left;" | Others
| 
| 7,049 || 1.47% || 0
|- style="background-color:pink"
| style="text-align:left;" colspan="3" | Chiamparino coalition (Centre-left)
| 194,820 || 40.62% ||30
|-
| style="background-color:" |
| style="text-align:left;" colspan="2" | Communist Refoundation Party (Rifondazione Comunista)
| PRC
| 17,002 || 3.54% || 1
|-
| style="background-color:" |
| style="text-align:left;" colspan="2" | Others 
| 
| 38,863 || 8.21% || 0
|-
| colspan="7" style="background-color:#E9E9E9" | 
|- style="font-weight:bold;"
| style="text-align:left;" colspan="4" | Total
| 479,639 || 100% || 50
|-
| colspan="7" style="background-color:#E9E9E9" | 
|-
| style="text-align:left;" colspan="4" | Votes cast / turnout 
| 637,160 || 82.57% || style="background-color:#E9E9E9;" |
|-
| style="text-align:left;" colspan="4" | Registered voters
| 771,683 ||  || style="background-color:#E9E9E9;" |
|-
| colspan="7" style="background-color:#E9E9E9" | 
|-
| style="text-align:left;" colspan="7" | Source: Ministry of the Interior
|}

Notes

Mayoral and City Council election, 2006
The election took place on 28–29 May 2006.

|- 
| colspan="7"| 
|-
|- style="background-color:#E9E9E9;text-align:center;"
! colspan="4" rowspan="1" style="text-align:left;" | Parties and coalitions
! colspan="1" | Votes
! colspan="1" | %
! colspan="1" | Seats
|-
| style="background-color:pink" rowspan="6" |
| style="background-color:" |
| style="text-align:left;" | The Olive Tree (L'Ulivo)
| 
| 152,162 || 39.47% || 23
|-
| style="background-color:" |
| style="text-align:left;" | Communist Refoundation Party (Rifondazione Comunista)
| PRC
| 30,254 || 7.85% || 4
|-
| style="background-color:" |
| style="text-align:left;" | Moderates (Moderati)
| Mod
| 15,236 || 3.95% || 2
|-
| style="background-color:" |
| style="text-align:left;" | Party of Italian Communists (Comunisti Italiani)
| PdCI
| 11,894 || 3.09% || 1
|-
| style="background-color:" |
| style="text-align:left;" | Others
| 
| 35,687 || 9.26% || 3
|- style="background-color:pink"
| style="text-align:left;" colspan="3" | Chiamparino coalition (Centre-left)
| 245,233 || 63.62% ||33
|-
| style="background-color:lightblue" rowspan="5" |
| style="background-color:" |
| style="text-align:left;" | Forza Italia 
| FI
| 56,319 || 14.61% || 8
|-
| style="background-color:" |
| style="text-align:left;" | National Alliance (Alleanza Nazionale)
| AN
| 32,724 || 8.49% || 5
|-
| style="background-color:" |
| style="text-align:left;" | Union of the Centre (Unione di Centro)
| UDC
| 19,391 || 5.03% || 3
|-
| style="background-color:" |
| style="text-align:left;" | Lega Nord 
| LN
| 9,549 || 2.48% || 1
|-
| style="background-color:" |
| style="text-align:left;" | Others 
| 
| 5,985 || 1.55% || 0
|- style="background-color:lightblue"
| colspan="4" style="text-align:left;" | Buttiglione coalition (Centre-right)
| 123,968 || 32.16% || 17
|-
| style="background-color:" |
| style="text-align:left;" colspan="2" | Others 
| 
| 16,279 || 4.22% || 0
|-
| colspan="7" style="background-color:#E9E9E9" | 
|- style="font-weight:bold;"
| style="text-align:left;" colspan="4" | Total
| 385,480 || 100% || 50
|-
| colspan="7" style="background-color:#E9E9E9" | 
|-
| style="text-align:left;" colspan="4" | Votes cast / turnout 
| 477,038 || 64.74% || style="background-color:#E9E9E9;" |
|-
| style="text-align:left;" colspan="4" | Registered voters
| 736,892 ||  || style="background-color:#E9E9E9;" |
|-
| colspan="7" style="background-color:#E9E9E9" | 
|-
| style="text-align:left;" colspan="7" | Source: Ministry of the Interior
|}

Mayoral and City Council election, 2011
The election took place on 15–16 May 2011.

|- 
| colspan="7"| 
|-
|- style="background-color:#E9E9E9;text-align:center;"
! colspan="4" rowspan="1" style="text-align:left;" | Parties and coalitions
! colspan="1" | Votes
! colspan="1" | %
! colspan="1" | Seats
|-
| style="background-color:pink" rowspan="5" |
| style="background-color:" |
| style="text-align:left;" | Democratic Party (Partito Democratico)
| PD
| 138,103 || 34.50% || 16
|-
| style="background-color:#008ECE" |
| style="text-align:left;" | Moderates (Moderati)
| Mod
| 36,267 || 9.06% || 4
|-
| style="background-color:" |
| style="text-align:left;" | Left Ecology Freedom (Sinistra Ecologia e Libertà)
| SEL
| 22,647 || 5.66% || 2
|-
| style="background-color:" |
| style="text-align:left;" | Italy of Values (Italia dei Valori)
| IdV
| 19,055 || 4.76% || 2
|-
| style="background-color:" |
| style="text-align:left;" | Others 
| 
| 10.075 || 2.51% || 0
|- style="background-color:pink"
| style="text-align:left;" colspan="4" | Fassino coalition (Centre-left)
| 226,147 || 56.50% || 24
|-
| style="background-color:lightblue" rowspan="4" |
| style="background-color:" |
| style="text-align:left;" | The People of Freedom (Il Popolo della Libertà)
| PdL
| 73,197 || 18.29% || 8
|-
| style="background-color:" |
| style="text-align:left;" | Lega Nord 
| LN
| 27,451 || 6.86% || 3
|-
| style="background-color:" |
| style="text-align:left;" | The Right (La Destra)
| LD
| 2,396 || 0.60% || 0
|-
| style="background-color:" |
| style="text-align:left;" | Others
| 
| 4,395 || 1.09% || 0
|- style="background-color:lightblue"
| colspan="4" style="text-align:left;" | Coppola coalition (Centre-right)
| 107,439 || 26.84% || 11
|-
| style="background-color:" |
| style="text-align:left;" colspan="2" | Five Star Movement (Movimento Cinque Stelle)
| M5S
| 21,078 || 5.27% || 2
|-
| style="background-color:" |
| style="text-align:left;" colspan="2" | Union of the Centre & allies (Unione di Centro)
| UDC
| 20,655 || 5.16% || 2
|-
| style="background-color:" |
| style="text-align:left;" colspan="2" | Talking Cricket List & allies (Lista del Grillo Parlante)
| LGP
| 14,517 || 3.63% || 1
|-
| style="background-color:" |
| style="text-align:left;" colspan="2" | Others 
| 
| 10,421 || 2.59% || 0
|-
| colspan="7" style="background-color:#E9E9E9" | 
|- style="font-weight:bold;"
| style="text-align:left;" colspan="4" | Total
| 400,257 || 100% || 40
|-
| colspan="7" style="background-color:#E9E9E9" | 
|-
| style="text-align:left;" colspan="4" | Votes cast / turnout 
| 470,946 || 66.53% || style="background-color:#E9E9E9;" |
|-
| style="text-align:left;" colspan="4" | Registered voters
| 707,817 ||  || style="background-color:#E9E9E9;" |
|-
| colspan="7" style="background-color:#E9E9E9" | 
|-
| style="text-align:left;" colspan="7" | Source: Ministry of the Interior
|}

Mayoral and City Council election, 2016
The election took place in two rounds: the first on 5 June, the second on 19 June 2016.

|- 
| colspan="7"| 
|-
|- style="background-color:#E9E9E9;text-align:center;"
! colspan="4" rowspan="1" style="text-align:left;" | Parties and coalitions
! colspan="1" | Votes
! colspan="1" | %
! colspan="1" | Seats
|-
| style="background-color:pink" rowspan="4" |
| style="background-color:" |
| style="text-align:left;" | Democratic Party (Partito Democratico)
| PD
| 106,818 || 29.77% || 9
|-
| style="background-color:#008ECE" |
| style="text-align:left;" | Moderates (Moderati)
| Mod
| 21,307 || 5.94% || 1
|-
| style="background-color:orange" |
| style="text-align:left;" | Fassino List (Lista Fassino)
| LF
| 14,898 || 4.15% || 1
|-
| style="background-color:" |
| style="text-align:left;" | Left for the City (Sinistra per la Città)
| SpC
| 7,253 || 2.02% || 0
|- style="background-color:pink"
| style="text-align:left;" colspan="4" | Fassino coalition (Centre-left)
| 150,276 || 41.88% || 11
|-
| style="background-color:" |
| style="text-align:left;" colspan="2" | Five Star Movement (Movimento Cinque Stelle)
| M5S
| 107,680 || 30.01% ||24
|-
| style="background-color:#5072A7" rowspan="3" |
| style="background-color:" |
| style="text-align:left;" | Lega Nord 
| LN
| 20,769 || 5.79% || 2
|-
| style="background-color:" |
| style="text-align:left;" | Brothers of Italy (Fratelli d'Italia)
| FdI
| 5,259 || 1.47% || 0
|-
| style="background-color:" |
| style="text-align:left;" | Others
| 
| 4,983 || 1.39% || 0
|- style="background-color:#5072A7"
| colspan="4" style="text-align:left;" | Morano coalition (Right-wing)
| 31,011 || 8.64% || 2
|-
| style="background-color:" |
| style="text-align:left;" colspan="2" | Forza Italia & allies
| FI
| 19,686 || 5.49% || 1
|-
| style="background-color:" |
| style="text-align:left;" colspan="2" | Union of the Centre & allies (Unione di Centro)
| UDC
| 18,751 || 5.23% || 1
|-
| style="background-color:" |
| style="text-align:left;" colspan="2" | Turin in Common & allies (Torino in Comune)
| TiC
| 13,436 || 3.74% || 1
|-
| style="background-color:" |
| style="text-align:left;" colspan="2" | Others 
| 
| 17,965 || 5.01% || 0
|-
| colspan="7" style="background-color:#E9E9E9" | 
|- style="font-weight:bold;"
| style="text-align:left;" colspan="4" | Total
| 358,805 || 100% || 40
|-
| colspan="7" style="background-color:#E9E9E9" | 
|-
| style="text-align:left;" colspan="4" | Votes cast / turnout 
| 397,811 || 57.18% || style="background-color:#E9E9E9;" |
|-
| style="text-align:left;" colspan="4" | Registered voters
| 695,740 ||  || style="background-color:#E9E9E9;" |
|-
| colspan="7" style="background-color:#E9E9E9" | 
|-
| style="text-align:left;" colspan="7" | Source: Ministry of the Interior
|}

Notes

Mayoral and City Council election, 2021
The election took place in two rounds: the first on 3–4 October, the second on 17–18 October 2021.

|- 
| colspan="7"| 
|-
|- style="background-color:#E9E9E9;text-align:center;"
! colspan="4" rowspan="1" style="text-align:left;" | Parties and coalitions
! colspan="1" | Votes
! colspan="1" | %
! colspan="1" | Seats
|-
| style="background-color:pink" rowspan="5" |
| style="background-color:" |
| style="text-align:left;" | Democratic Party (Partito Democratico)
| PD
| 85,890 || 28.56% || 17
|-
| style="background-color:orange" |
| style="text-align:left;" | Lo Russo List (Lista Lo Russo)
| LR
| 15,013 || 4.99% || 2
|-
| style="background-color:" |
| style="text-align:left;" | Ecologist Left (Sinistra Ecologista)
| SE
| 10,807 || 3.59% || 2
|-
| style="background-color:#008ECE" |
| style="text-align:left;" | Moderates (Moderati)
| Mod
| 10,177 || 3.38% || 2
|-
| style="background-color:" |
| style="text-align:left;" | Others
| 
| 10,367 || 3.45% || 1
|- style="background-color:pink"
| style="text-align:left;" colspan="4" | Lo Russo coalition (Centre-left)
| 132,254 || 43.97% || 24
|-
| style="background-color:lightblue" rowspan="5" |
| style="background-color:gold" |
| style="text-align:left;" | Very Beautiful Turin (Torino Bellissima)
| TB
| 35,658 || 11.86% || 5
|-
| style="background-color:" |
| style="text-align:left;" | Brothers of Italy (Fratelli d'Italia)
| FdI
| 31,490 || 10.47% || 3
|-
| style="background-color:" |
| style="text-align:left;" | Lega 
| LN
| 29,593 || 9.84% || 3
|-
| style="background-color:" |
| style="text-align:left;" | Forza Italia-Union of the Centre
| FI-UDC
| 15,951 || 5.30% || 2
|-
| style="background-color:" |
| style="text-align:left;" | Others
| 
| 4,861 || 1.61% || 0
|- style="background-color:lightblue"
| colspan="4" style="text-align:left;" | Damilano coalition (Center-right)
| 117,553 || 39.08% || 13
|-
| style="background-color:" |
| style="text-align:left;" colspan="2" | Five Star Movement & allies
| M5S
| 26,769 || 8.90% || 3
|-
| style="background-color:" |
| style="text-align:left;" colspan="2" | Others 
| 
| 24,207 || 8.05% || 0
|-
| colspan="7" style="background-color:#E9E9E9" | 
|- style="font-weight:bold;"
| style="text-align:left;" colspan="4" | Total
| 300,783 || 100% || 40
|-
| colspan="7" style="background-color:#E9E9E9" | 
|-
| style="text-align:left;" colspan="4" | Votes cast / turnout 
| 331,556 || 48.08% || style="background-color:#E9E9E9;" |
|-
| style="text-align:left;" colspan="4" | Registered voters
| 689,684 ||  || style="background-color:#E9E9E9;" |
|-
| colspan="7" style="background-color:#E9E9E9" | 
|-
| style="text-align:left;" colspan="7" | Source: Ministry of the Interior
|}

See also
 Timeline of Turin

References

Notes
:it:Sindaci di Torino (since 1564)
Davide Giovanni Cravero, Trecento anni di vita del Palazzo Civico di Torino: 1663–1963, Published by the City of Turin, 1964, available online here
Photo Gallery of the mayors of Turin 1945–2005

Turin
 
Turin-related lists